Thalappil Pradeep is an institute professor and professor of chemistry in the Department of Chemistry at the Indian Institute of Technology Madras. He is also the Deepak Parekh Chair Professor. In 2020 he received the Padma Shri award for his distinguished work in the field of Science and Technology. He has received the Nikkei Asia Prize (2020), The World Academy of Sciences (TWAS) prize (2018), and the Shanti Swarup Bhatnagar Prize for Science and Technology in 2008 by Council of Scientific and Industrial Research.

Early life 
Pradeep was born on July 8, 1963, at Panthavoor, Kerala, India, to (late) Thalappil Narayanan Nair and Pulakkat Panampattavalappil Kunjilakshmi Amma. Both his parents were school teachers. His father was a writer too, with the pen name N. N. Thalappil, who authored 14 books in Malayalam.

Pradeep was educated in government schools all through. From 5th to 10th, he was educated at the Govt. High School, Mookkuthala where his father taught Malayalam and mother taught social studies. The school was built by Shri. Pakaravoor Chitran Namboothiripad, who donated it to the Government at a token price of Rs. 1. Most of the days he walked the 4  km trip to the school, as most of his classmates. Later, he was educated at the MES College, Ponnani for his Pre Degree, St. Thomas College, Thrissur for his BSc and Farook College, Kozhikode for his MSc, all under Calicut University.

Early research 
Pradeep earned a PhD degree in chemical physics working with Professors C. N. R. Rao and M. S. Hegde at the Indian Institute of Science, Bangalore during 1986–91. Subsequently, he spent about two years as a post-doctoral fellow at the University of California, Berkeley with Prof. David A. Shirley and Purdue University, Indiana with Prof. R. Graham Cooks. Since then, he has been working at the Indian Institute of Technology Madras, where he is an institute professor. He held visiting positions at Purdue University, Leiden University, in the Netherlands, EPFL, Switzerland, the Institute of Chemistry, Taiwan, Pohang University of Science and Technology, South Korea and the University of Hyogo, Japan.

Current research and research group 
Pradeep's work is in the area of molecular materials and surfaces. The materials and phenomena he discovered have implications to clean environment, affordable clean water and ultrasensitive devices. Some of his discoveries have been translated to viable products and several of his recent findings  have immense scope for the benefit of the world at large and developing world in particular. Along with such studies, he pursued fundamental problems of relevance to the science of ice surfaces.  For studies of ultrathin surfaces of molecular solids such as ices, he developed unique instrumentation, an important aspect of his research.

Pradeep discovered several atomically precise clusters or nano molecules of noble metals. These are molecules composed of a few atom cores, protected with ligands, especially thiols which are fundamentally different from their bulk and plasmonic analogues in terms of their optical, electronic, and structural properties. Such clusters show distinct absorption spectra and well-defined luminescence, mostly in the visible and near-infrared regions, just as molecules. He introduced several new synthetic approaches to make new clusters (a summary of the methods is presented in reference), showed some of the very first examples of chemistry with such materials and developed applications with them. Most recent of these examples is the introduction of inter-cluster reactions between clusters, which demonstrate that nanoparticles behave like simple molecules and stoichiometric reactions of the type, A + B → C + D, can be written for these processes, where A, B, C and D are nanoparticles. To describe the structure and properties of such clusters, his group has introduced a system of nomenclature for such systems in general. This kind of chemistry performed with isotopically pure nanoparticles of the same metal has shown that metal atoms in nanoparticles undergo rapid exchange in solution as in the case of water.

The important atomically precise clusters he discovered are: Ag7/8, Ag9, Au23, Ag152  and the smallest molecular alloy, Ag7Au6. He created methods to form highly uniform nanotriangles and introduced a new family of materials called mesoflowers. Combining luminescent atomically precise clusters with mesoflowers and nanofibres, he developed sensors at sub-zeptomole levels  which are probably the limits of fast molecular detection. A single mesoflower has been shown to detect nine molecules of trinitrotoluene (TNT). A recent example of this chemistry is the detection of 80 ions of Hg2+ with single nanofibers. A number of atomically precise luminescent clusters have been made in proteins and their growth involves inter-protein metal transfer. These clusters were shown to be excellent biolabels. Early examples of cluster functionalisation were demonstrated by him and the methods he introduced are shown to impart properties such as fluorescence resonance energy transfer to such systems and these methodologies are now used for applications. Cluster functionalisation chemistry has recently been extended to make isomers of nanomolecules and these have been isolated in collaboration with Japanese scientists. He has recently demonstrated supramolecular functionalisation of clusters. Such clusters help assemble 1D nanostructures, leading to precise 3D structures.

Simple methods of synthesis and analysis have been some of the focal themes of his research. In a recent work, molecular ionization was demonstrated at 1 V from a carbon nanotubes-impregnated paper. This methodology was used to collect high quality mass spectra of diverse analytes. Besides the advantage of low internal energy of the ions, which preserves fragile species and intermediates, the methodology helps in miniaturising mass spectrometry. Ion-based chemistry is now used to synthesise structures such as metal grasslands, extending over cm2 areas.

He discovered noble metal nanoparticle-based drinking water purification methods and developed the world's first drinking water filters utilising nanochemistry. The chemistry he developed was reductive dehalogenation of halocarbons at noble metal nanoparticle surfaces which when applied to several of the common pesticides present in surface waters of India, resulted in their degradation at room temperature and extremely low concentrations, of the order of parts per billion. The process when occurs on supported nanoparticles, trace concentrations of halocarbon pesticides can be removed from a flowing water stream. Water purifiers based on this technology have been introduced in the market since 2007. As a result of this innovation, many activities have started in India and elsewhere and we are now certain of the impact of nanomaterials in clean water. About 1.5 million of these filters have been sold in the market till 2016. IIT Madras received over Rs. 230 lakhs in royalties from this finding, the first of its kind in the Indian university system, in terms of royalty earnings and reach from a single patent.

He developed several new technologies in the recent past to tackle various other contaminants such as arsenic, lead, mercury and organics in water, which are the subject of a few issued and filed patents. Such capabilities to bring contaminant concentrations under drinking water norms using diverse nanomaterials, feasible synthesis of such materials in quantities, creation of viable processes for their implementation along with the use of efficient sensors would make clean drinking water affordable using nanomaterials. A critical problem in achieving this goal is the development of advanced and affordable materials with no or reduced environmental impact. Some of the materials and technologies he has developed over the years have been combined to make affordable all-inclusive point-of-use drinking water purifiers, which are being installed in various parts of the country, both as a community and as domestic units. These advanced sand-like composites are made in the water at room temperature, with no environmental cost. Gravity-fed water solutions using such materials without the use of electricity can make sustainable access to safe drinking water a reality.

With all these developments, ‘nanomaterials for water purification’ is recognised as one of the major themes of research in the area. Pradeep has shown that completely home-grown nanotechnology, from lab to market is possible in India. His recent discovery of ultrasensitive single-particle sensors with the capacity to detect a few tens of molecules and ions may be combined with new materials to make simultaneous sensing and scavenging at ultra-trace levels possible. The new materials he has developed have been put together to make community purifiers in arsenic affected areas of West Bengal which have been running for seven years. Arsenic-free water is now being delivered to about 10,00,000 people using these technologies. The technology has now been approved for national implementation.

He created 3D organised structures of nanoparticles called superlattices and used them for surface enhanced Raman imaging and specific gas sensing applications.

In his earlier research, Pradeep discovered that binding of metallic nanoparticles on metallic carbon nanotube bundles made the latter semiconducting and consequently the nanoparticle-nanotube composite became luminescent in the visible region. This luminescence was reversible by the exposure of specific gases such as hydrogen as they occupied the interstitial sites of the bundle. He showed a transverse electrokinetic effect in metal nanoparticle assemblies which resulted in a potential when a liquid was flown over it. Using spectroscopic and scattering techniques, he showed that long chain monolayers on metal nanoparticle surfaces were rotationally frozen. This is in contrast to the monolayers on planar surfaces, which are in a rotator phase at room temperature (RT). All of these results have implications to the applications of nanoparticles in diverse areas.

Other aspect of his research is on ice, the solid form of water. He found novel processes occurring at the very top of ice surfaces which are of particular relevance to atmospheric chemistry. Among the various examples, he has shown that the vapour pressures of gases oscillate over melting ice; the study has implications to the fundamental understanding of dynamics of gas phase over condensed systems. He showed that the elementary reaction, H+ + H2O → H3O+ in the gas phase and in liquid water happens differently on ice surfaces, namely one channel follows, H+ + H2O (ice) →  H2+ + OH.(ice), when H+ collides ice at ultra low kinetic energies. In other words, while H+ makes hydronium ion in liquid water, it results in dihydrogen cation on ice. He showed that molecular transport of even slightly different molecules is largely different within ice. To discover and understand such processes, especially at the very top of ice, he built the very first ultra low energy (1-10 eV) ion scattering spectrometer, a new tool in extremely surface sensitive spectroscopy, working at cryogenic temperatures as in space. In this experiment, mass and energy selected ions undergo collisions at ultra-thin molecular surfaces prepared on single crystals and the product ions are studied by a mass spectrometer. The surfaces are simultaneously characterized by a range of techniques such as reflection-absorption infrared spectroscopy and secondary ion mass spectrometry. Using this infrastructure the group has shown that methane hydrate can exist in ultrahigh vacuum and at ultra-cold conditions as in interstellar space.

The current research group is a mix of diverse expertise. The group members are largely chemists along with some chemical engineers, physicists, computer science graduates, biologists and instrumentation engineers. The group has almost all the tools required for advanced materials science within itself. Other facilities are available in the institute. There are also intense collaborations with scientists across the world.

He has taught undergraduate and graduate-level courses at IITM for over 25 years and trained over 250 students at various levels to conduct research, including 45 completed and 30 ongoing PhDs, 110 MSc/MTech theses, 40 postdocs and several visiting students from India and abroad.

Honors and awards 
 2022 - VinFuture Prize
 2022 - Prince Sultan Bin Abdulaziz International Prize for Water
 2020 - Padma Shri
 2020 - Nikkei Asia Prize 2020
 2018 - The World Academy of Sciences (TWAS) Prize in Chemistry
  2015 - J. C. Bose National Fellowship
 2008 - Shanti Swarup Bhatnagar Prize for Science and Technology
  2003 - B. M. Birla Science Prize, Young Scientist Award of the Chemical Research Society of India

Incubation 
Five companies have been incubated.

1. InnoNano Research Pvt. Ltd. (a start-up company at IIT Madras). Not operational currently.

2. Innodi Water Technologies Pvt. Ltd. (incubated at IIT Madras Incubation Cell). InnoDI (inno-dee-eye) develops and builds Capacitive De-ionization (CDI) based water treatment systems for the Indian and international market and has established manufacturing facilities.

3. VayuJal Technologies Pvt. Ltd. (incubated at IIT Madras Incubation Cell). Vayujal develops power-efficient atmospheric water generators.

4. AquEasy Innovations Pvt. Ltd. (incubated at IIT Madras Incubation Cell). AquEasy makes an affordable, point of use drinking water purification technologies.

5. Hydromaterials Pvt. Ltd. (incubated at IIT Madras Incubation Cell). Hydromaterials uses new materials for clean water.

These technologies have delivered clean water to 10 million people.

Several other patents have been licensed.

Conceptualised and built state of the art centres for advanced research and technology development,
Thematic Unit of Excellence was built for developing new technologies in the water sector.

To build such technologies with the participation of the global community, a new centre called the International Centre for Clean Water (ICCW) was built at the IIT Madras Research Park.

Books

In English 
1. T. Pradeep, Nano: The Essentials Understanding Nanoscience and Nanotechnology, Tata McGraw-Hill, New Delhi, 2007, reprinted 2008, 2009, 2010 (twice), 2011, 2012, 2014, 2015, 2015, 2016, 2017, 2018, 2019 and 2020.

2. S. K. Das, S. U. S. Choi, W. Yu, T. Pradeep, Nanofluids Science and Technology, John Wiley, New York (2008).

3. Nano: The Essentials Understanding Nanoscience and Nanotechnology, McGraw-Hill, April 2008. (International edition).

4. Nano: The Essentials Understanding Nanoscience and Nanotechnology, in Japanese, Kyorisu Press, August 2011.

5. T. Pradeep and others, A Textbook on Nanoscience and Nanotechnology, McGraw-Hill Education, New Delhi 2012. (This book is now a textbook in several universities for advanced nanoscience and nanotechnology courses). Reprinted 2014.

6. David E. Reisner and T. Pradeep (Eds.), Aquananotechnology: Global Prospects, CRC Press, New York, 2015.

7. T. Pradeep (Ed.), Atomically Precise Metal Nanoclusters, Elsevier, October 2022. 

There are several books in which his articles are included.

A few are below:

1. Detection and extraction of pesticides from drinking water using nanotechnologies, T. Pradeep and Anshup, in Nanotechnology applications for clean water N. Savage, M. Diallo, J. Duncan, A. Street and R. Sustich (Ed), William Andrew, New York, 2008.

2. Gold nanoparticles, P. R. Sajanlal and T. Pradeep, Kirk-Othmer Encyclopedia (2011).

3. Noble metal nanoparticles, T. S. Sreeprasad and T. Pradeep, Springer Handbook of Nanomaterials, R. Vajtai (Ed.), Springer, Heidelberg, 2013.

4. Noble metal clusters in protein templates, T. Pradeep, A. Baksi and P. L. Xavier in Functional nanometer-sized clusters of transition metals: Synthesis, properties and applications, W. Chen and S. Chen (Ed.), RSC Publishing, London, 2014.

5. Detection and extraction of pesticides from drinking water using nanotechnologies (Second Edition), T. Pradeep, Anshup and M. S. Bootharaju, in Nanotechnology applications for clean water  A. Street, R. Sustich, J. Duncan and N. Savage (Ed.), Elsevier, 2014.

In Malayalam 
1. ‘Vipathinte Kalochakal’, T. Pradeep, National Book Stall, Kottayam, 1990.

2. ‘Aanava Prathisandhi’ T. Pradeep and K. Vijayamohanan, DC Books, Kottayam, 1991.

3. Chapter in, “Anusakthi Aapathu”, Ed. RVG Menon, Sugathakumari, 1991.

4. “Kunjukanangalku Vasantham Nanotechnologikku Oramukham”, DC Books, Kottayam, 2007. This is based on a series of articles in Mathrubhumi Illustrated Weekly published during 2006–2007. (Won the Kerala Sahitya Academi Award of 2010)

5. Chapter in, Rasathanthram: Jeevithavum Bhavium (translated as Chemistry: Life and Future), Kerala Sastra Sahitya Parishad, Trissur, 2011.

There are several popular science articles in English and Malayalam.

Recognition 
Pradeep is a Fellow of the Indian National Science Academy, Indian Academy of Sciences, Indian National Academy of Engineering, The National Academy of Sciences, The Royal Society of Chemistry, The American Association for the Advancement of Science, and The World Academy of Sciences. He has received the lifetime achievement research award of Indian Institute of Technology, Madras and is designated as an Institute Professor.

He is Associate Editor of the journal, ACS Sustainable Chemistry & Engineering, 2014-. 
Editorial Boards: Asian Journal of   Spectroscopy, 2000-; Oriental Journal of Chemistry, 2000-; Nano Reviews, 2010- ACS Applied Materials and Interfaces, 2012–2015; Particle, 2012-; Surface Innovations, 2012-; Nanoscale, 2014-; Chemistry – An Asian Journal, 2014-; Scientific Reports (Nature Group), 2015-; International Journal of Water and Wastewater Treatment, 2015-; Chemistry of Materials, 2018-; ACS Nano, 2018-; Nanoscale Advances, 2019-; Analytical Chemistry, 2020-.

Views on nanotechnology 
Pradeep has been advocating the use of noble metal-based nanotechnology for purifying the environment. As scientific understanding of the health effects of contaminants increases, it is likely that their allowed limits will be continuously revised. The contaminants levels are expected to reach molecular limits in the years to come. This implies that the technologies we use have to become molecule-specific and nanotechnology becomes the obvious choice. Such technologies have to combine with many others for a sustainable society. Several such pointers are suggested.

References

External links 

Nanotechnology for drinking water purification
Glowing future for nanotubes
IIT Madras – Faculty page of Professor T. Pradeep
 Research articles published in peer-reviewed journals, from Professor T. Pradeep’s group
 Popular science articles published by Professor T. Pradeep

Academic staff of IIT Madras
Living people
Indian nanotechnologists
Scientists from Kerala
Writers from Kerala
Indian Institute of Science alumni
St. Thomas College, Thrissur alumni
Malayalam-language writers
Indian technology writers
20th-century Indian engineers
20th-century Indian chemists
20th-century Indian non-fiction writers
TWAS laureates
Year of birth missing (living people)
Recipients of the Padma Shri in science & engineering
Winners of the Nikkei Asia Prize
University of Calicut alumni